Andrzej Pstrokoński (28 June 1936 – 24 December 2022) was a Polish basketball player. He competed in the men's tournament at the 1960 Summer Olympics, and the 1964 Summer Olympics.

References

1936 births
2022 deaths
Polish men's basketball players
Olympic basketball players of Poland
Polish basketball coaches
Legia Warsaw (basketball) players
Basketball players at the 1960 Summer Olympics
Basketball players at the 1964 Summer Olympics
Basketball players from Warsaw